Is Everybody Happy? (1929) is an American pre-Code musical film starring Ted Lewis, Alice Day, Lawrence Grant, Ann Pennington, and Julia Swayne Gordon, directed by Archie Mayo, and released by Warner Bros. The music for the film was written by Harry Akst and Grant Clarke, except for "St. Louis Blues" by W. C. Handy and "Tiger Rag". The film's title comes from Lewis's catchphrase "Is everybody happy?"

The film's soundtrack exists on Vitaphone discs preserved at the UCLA Film and Television Archive, but the film itself is considered a lost film, according to the Vitaphone Project website. A five-minute clip from the film can be found on YouTube.

Lewis and his orchestra also appeared in a short subject called Is Everybody Happy? (1941), consisting of musical numbers cut from the Abbott and Costello feature film Hold That Ghost (1941) released by Universal Studios. Columbia Pictures released a feature-length biopic of Lewis also titled Is Everybody Happy? (1943).

Cast 
Ted Lewis as Ted Todd
Alice Day as Gail Wilson
Ann Pennington as Lena Schmitt
Lawrence Grant as Victor Molnár
Julia Swayne Gordon as  Mrs. Molnár
Otto Hoffman as Landlord
Purnell Pratt as Stage Manager
Muggsy Spanier as himself

Soundtrack
"Wouldn't It Be Wonderful?" - written by Harry Akst, Grant Clarke
"I'm the Medicine Man For the Blues" - written by Harry Akst, Grant Clarke
"Samoa" - written by Harry Akst, Grant Clarke
"New Orleans" - written by Harry Akst, Grant Clarke
"In the Land of Jazz" - written by Harry Akst, Grant Clarke
"Start the Band" - written by Harry Akst, Grant Clarke
"St. Louis Blues" - written by W. C. Handy
"Tiger Rag" - music by Henry Ragas (as H. W. Ragas), Nick LaRocca (as D. J. La Rocca), Larry Shields (as L. Shields), Tony Sbarbaro (as A. Sbarbaro) and Edwin B. Edwards (as E. B. Edwards); lyrics by Harry DeCosta (as Harry Da Costa)

References
Notes

External links 

Audio from Vitaphone disc of trailer for Is Everybody Happy? (1929)
Is Everybody Happy? (1929) at Silent Era

1929 films
1929 musical films
American musical films
American black-and-white films
1920s English-language films
Films directed by Archie Mayo
Warner Bros. films
Lost American films
1929 lost films
Lost musical films
1920s American films